The 2022 Open P2I Angers Arena Loire was a professional tennis tournament played on indoor hard courts. It was the 2nd edition of the tournament and part of the 2022 WTA 125 tournaments season, offering a total of $115,000 in prize money. It took place in Angers, France from 5 to 11 December 2022.

Champions

Singles

  Alycia Parks def.  Anna-Lena Friedsam 6–4, 4–6, 6–4

Doubles

  Alycia Parks /  Zhang Shuai def.  Miriam Kolodziejová /  Markéta Vondroušová 6–2, 6–2

Singles main draw entrants

Seeds 

 1 Rankings as of 28 November 2022.

Other entrants 
The following players received a wildcard into the singles main draw:
  Tessah Andrianjafitrimo
  Sofia Kenin
  Sabine Lisicki
  Jessika Ponchet
  Zhang Shuai

The following players received entry into the singles main draw through protected ranking:
  Yanina Wickmayer
  Katarina Zavatska

The following players received entry from the qualifying draw:
  Émeline Dartron
  Joanna Garland
  Magali Kempen
  Greet Minnen

The following players received entry as lucky loser:
  Hina Inoue
  Pemra Özgen

Withdrawals
Before the tournament
  Erika Andreeva → replaced by  Yanina Wickmayer
  Elina Avanesyan → replaced by  Hina Inoue
  Jodie Burrage → replaced by  Anna-Lena Friedsam
  Vitalia Diatchenko → replaced by  Joanne Züger
  Léolia Jeanjean → replaced by  Pemra Özgen
  Linda Nosková → replaced by  Jaqueline Cristian
  Nuria Párrizas Díaz → replaced by  Katarina Zavatska

Doubles entrants

Seeds 

 1 Rankings as of 28 November 2022.

Other entrants 
The following pair received a wildcard into the doubles main draw:
  Magali Kempen /  Elixane Lechemia

References

External links 
 Official website

2022 WTA 125 tournaments
2022 in French tennis
December 2022 sports events in France